Road & Track (stylized as R&T) is an American automotive enthusiast magazine. It is owned by Hearst Magazines and is published 6 times per year. The editorial offices are located in New York, New York.

History
Road & Track (often abbreviated R&T) was founded by two friends, Wilfred H. Brehaut, Jr. and Joseph S. Fennessy, in 1947, in Hempstead, New York. Published only six times from 1947 to 1949, it struggled in its early years. By 1952, regular contributor and editor John R. Bond and his wife Elaine had become the owners of the magazine, which then grew until its sale to CBS Publications in 1972.

The ampersand (&) in the title was introduced in 1955 by then Editor Terry Galanoy, who replaced the word "and" in the magazine's name because the words Road and Track were graphically too long for newsstand-effective recognition.

In 1988, Hachette Filipacchi Media took ownership of the magazine. In October 2008, Matt DeLorenzo became editor-in-chief, succeeding Thos L. Bryant, who had been in place for 20 years. Hearst Magazines purchased the magazine in 2011. In June 2012, Larry Webster assumed the role of editor-in-chief, and DeLorenzo became an adviser to the publication. Additionally, the magazine moved its operations from Newport Beach, California, to Ann Arbor, Michigan.

In February 2016, Webster resigned as editor-in-chief and Kim Wolfkill was announced as his replacement. In the March/April 2019 issue, Wolfkill announced that the editorial offices in Michigan were closing, and that publication was moving to New York, New York, at the Hearst Tower. His LinkedIn profile lists February 2019 as his final date at Road & Track. Travis Okulski, Road & Track's website director at the time, took on the editor-in-chief role from the May 2019 issue onwards.

Car and Driver and Road & Track are sister publications at Hearst and share the same advertising, sales, marketing, and circulation departments. However, their editorial operations are distinct and they have separate publishers.

In August 2020, the magazine transitioned to bi-monthly publishing and dropped the use of the full “Road & Track” title. In addition to the title change, the magazine design was relaunched in a minimalist style, and offered new subscription packages ranging from $75 per year to almost $1000. Prior to the relaunch, several key contributors left or were let go.

Content
Road & Track focuses on new production cars, vintage cars, and race cars with drive reviews, road trips, and comparison tests. Former race car drivers have often contributed material, including Paul Frère, Sam Posey, and Formula One champion Phil Hill. Other notable contributors include McLaren F1 designer Gordon Murray, car executive Bob Lutz, Henry N. Manney III, Peter Egan, Jason Cammisa, and Matt Farah.

Road & Track currently publishes four columns per issue:

 An editor's letter written by editor-in-chief Travis Okulski.
 "Enginerdy," a column that performs deep dives on engineering concepts related to the automotive sector.
 "Speed Secrets," written by former IndyCar driver Ross Bentley focusing on performance driving. 
 "Smithology," written by editor-at-large Sam Smith.

Like many auto magazines, Road & Track currently publishes an annual "car of the year" test, dubbed the Road & Track Performance Car of the Year. The test's most recent winner is the 2020 Hyundai Veloster N.

Video games
Road & Track contributed to the 1992 video game, Grand Prix Unlimited, developed by Accolade for MS-DOS. The magazine also contributed to the 1994 video game, The Need for Speed, to help the designers match vehicle behavior and sounds to that of the real cars.

See also 
 Car and Driver
Automobile
Motor Trend

References

External links
 Road & Track official site

1947 establishments in New York (state)
Automobile magazines published in the United States
Hearst Communications publications
Magazines established in 1947
Magazines published in California
Magazines published in Michigan
Magazines published in New York City
Mass media in Ann Arbor, Michigan
Need for Speed
Ten times annually magazines
Magazines published in New York (state)